Robert McKee Thomas (1908 – July 23, 1984) was a co-inventor of butyl rubber, along with William J. Sparks.  Thomas held 75 patents, and directed the work of several notable polymer scientists including Francis P. Baldwin.  He worked at the Standard Oil Company, in New Jersey, starting work in 1929 after obtaining a bachelor's degree in chemistry. He retired in 1965.

The ACS Rubber Division's Sparks-Thomas award is named after Thomas and Butyl rubber co-inventor William J. Sparks.

In 1969, he received the Charles Goodyear Medal.

References 

 R. B. Seymour, Pioneers in Polymer Science, 193-195, 1989, Kluwer Academic Publishers.

External links
Link to audio interview with Robert M. Thomas

1908 births
1984 deaths
20th-century American chemists
Polymer scientists and engineers
ExxonMobil people